The Fairbridge Festival is a music festival held annually since 1993 at Fairbridge village near Pinjarra in Western Australia. The festival is held over a weekend in April.

Visitors staying for the whole weekend can camp in the surrounding fields in tents or vans. The festival offers options for those who don't have their own camping equipment in the form of "Cosy Camping" and "Glamping". Day tickets are also available.

The event takes place over three days and three nights (Friday to Sunday), across 12 stages, which include marquees, a chapel, dance stage and workshop rooms. The program features a variety of musical genres such as blues, roots, Celtic, folk, dance, a cappella and world music as well as acts and activities specifically catering for children and young people.

Fairbridge Festival has experienced steady audience growth with the 2016 tally of about 15,000 day attendees. The most common patrons are families, but Fairbridge Festival is enjoyed by all ages including teenagers, young adults and the young at heart.

The 2017 Fairbridge Festival celebrated the festival's 25th anniversary, and part of these celebrations include an extended four-day event: 21–24 April 2017.

The last festival was held on 9–11 April 2021. The 2022 event is set for 22–24 April.

History
The Festival was established by Max Klubal and Sally Grice, who at the time were committee members of the Western Australian Folk Federation (WAFF). WAFF already ran a folk festival at Toodyay and formed a partnership with the organisation Parents for Music to run the festival at Fairbridge Village, in Pinjarra, with the intention of making it a more family-orientated event than Toodyay. The two festivals continued concurrently for two years but eventually the Toodyay festival ceased.

In 1996, Fairbridge Festival disassociated itself from WAFF to its present status as an incorporated not-for-profit association.

In 2006, a board of management was incorporated into Fairbridge Festival headed up by a president. During this time, a general manager was also appointed to lead the growing Festival Operations Group. who were mainly volunteers. Up until this point the president, Wendy Corrick, had managed the event.

Fairbridge Festival and the organisation, Fairbridge WA, were often confused, particularly in relation to invoicing and accounting matters. Fairbridge WA manages Fairbridge Village, the site of the Fairbridge Festival. To help distinguish the organisations, in November 2011, the incorporation changed its name from Fairbridge Festival Inc. to FolkWorld Inc. This change also better reflects the role of FolkWorld Inc. as the premier peak organisation supporting and promoting Folk Music in Western Australia.

Until 2014, Steve Barnes was the artistic director, in charge of programming the festival. Rod Vervest took over as artistic director in 2015. Fairbridge Festival's program is guided by its constitution: "FolkWorld Inc. is dedicated to promoting traditional, contemporary and multicultural folk music, dance and related performing arts, with particular emphasis on the involvement of families".

Overall festival programming is contributed to by several festival programmers, including a Children's Program Director, Youth Program Director and a Dance Program Director.

In 2012, the Fairbridge Festival Quest songwriting competition for high school-aged young people was launched and has been unearthing new talent from across Western Australia every year.

The 2017 Ben Elton film Three Summers is set at a fictional folk festival in Fairbridge which is called 'Westival', but is inspired by and based on the Fairbridge Festival. Ben Elton is a Patron of FolkWorld Inc.

Donations are invited to help support and contribute to the future of Fairbridge Festival and other FolkWorld Inc. initiatives. Donations of $2 or over are tax deductible.

The last Fairbridge Festival was held as scheduled on 9–11 April 2021. In 2020 the festival was postponed for 6 months, then cancelled, due to the COVID-19 pandemic.

The next festival is scheduled for 22–24 April 2022.

Site
The festival site was originally Fairbridge School, a combination of orphanage, farm school and Imperial social engineering project set up as part of a colonial vision by Kingsley Fairbridge in 1912. The school was founded with the mission of taking deprived children from the orphanages (such as Dr. Barnardo's Homes) and streets of Britain and giving them a healthy life in the Colonies, (while ensuring that the Colonies continued to be populated with sound Anglo-Saxon stock, as was the prevailing ethos of the time), the school functioned until the early 1960s.

2018

The 2019 festival will be held 26–28 April 2019.

2017
The 2017 festival was held 21–24 April. The acts were:

Andrew Winton & Dave Brewer's "Electric Blues Dance Hall"
Barefeet Sojourns
Bernard Carney
Bill Lawrie
Bluegrass Parkway
Brassika
Comedy Club
Daniel Susnjar Afro-Peruvian Jazz Club
Daoiri Farrell
Darling
De Cuba on
Duende Indalo
Earl St. Rum Rummers
Emily Wurramara
Flats & Sharps
Fromseier Hockings
Hannah Mae and the Hoodwinks
Harpeth Rising
Harry Hookey
Heathcote Blue
Himmerland
Inglorious Bardsters
Iris
Jack Harris
Jarlath Henderson
John Flanagan Trio
Josh Rennie-Hynes
Junkadelic Brass Band
Kristina Olsen
Lazy Colts
Les Poules a Colin
Leszek Karski
Los Car Keys
Los Porcheros
Lucy Peach
Lucy Wise
Miss Eileen & King Lear
Mucky Duck Bush Band
Odette Mercy & Her Soul Atomics
Oi Dipnoi
Open Swimmer
Phil Gray
Phil Wiggins (US) & Dom Turner
POW! Negro
Praashekh Borkar Quartet
Pugsley Buzzard
Ros and Steve Barnes with Blue Inc Trio
Salary
Sex on Toast
Something Doing
Soukouss Internationale
Soulin Wild
Spirit of the Streets Choir
Stella Donnelly
Ten Cent Shooters
The Albany Shantymen
The Bambuseae Rhythm Section
The Chipolatas
The Hilltones
The Kirwin Sisters
The Last Five Coins
The Little Lord Street Band
The Lost Quays
The New Macedon Rangers
The Raglans
The Rogues
Tom Richardson
Wasambai! Freo's Carnival Drummers
Acro Yoga
Morning Wake U With Taoist Tai Chi
Rainbow Yogis
True Spirit Revival - Yoga with Live Music
Yogateens
Rainbow Yogis
Axel Carrington
Belgrade
Beni Bjah
Demon Days
DJ Hap
DJ Ndorse
Feels
Idgie
Jack Davies
Kol Nafshi
Little Whiskey
New Nausea
Racoo Charles & the Moke Folk
South Fremantle SHS
Tandem
The Fruity Whites
African Oz Drum 'n' Dance
Arrr is for Adventure
Bedtime Stories with Glenn B Swift
Dr Hubble's Bubble Show
Kidz Kaperz with Glenn B Swift
Ladybird Entertainment
The Actors Workshop
Banjo Worm
Fair Maids of Perth
Hairball Street Theatre
Jesse Teichelman
Mad Tatters Morris
Per Contra Dance
Perth International Dance
Perth Morris Men
Push Me Pull You
Souleiado French Dance Group
Soukouss Dance Workshop
Wasamba! Freo's Carnival Drummers

2016
The 2016 festival was held 15–17 April. The acts were:

Loren Kate
Carus Thompson
Nadia Reid
The Mae Trio
Neil Murray
Carla Geneve
Albert Gray
Davey Craddock and the Spectacles
Galloping Foxleys
Chris Matthews
Simon & Tammy London
One Up Two Down
The Company
Gordie Tentrees with Jaxon Haldane
Powderkeg Reunion
Freddie White
Cat and Americana
Andrew Winton
The Recycled String Band
Andy Baylor's Cajun Combo
Jordan McRobbie
Fasta
Phillip Henry and Hannah Martin
The Freewheeler
Siar
Shanty Club
Voicemail
Iris
Tinpan Orange
Riley Pearce
The Sideshow Allies
The Baker Suite
Jacob Diamond
Things of Stone and Wood
The Beez
Devon Sproule
Eddie Green
Racoo Charles with the Moke Folk
Bullhorn
Tony McManus & Beppe Gambetta
Jason Freeman Fox & the Opposite of Everything
Messer's Lore
Double Entendre
The Tommyhawks
Los Kumbia Killers
Eastwinds
Red Sea Pedestrians
The Pioneers
Loaded Dog
Shelter
Poets Breakfast with Phil Gray
Inglorious Bardsters
Jones of A.R.K.
Glenn B Swift
Kidz Kaperz
Cook up a Storm!
"Arrr is for Adventure" Presented by Pirateman
The Pinch Pot Project
Free Little Library
Rainbow Yogis
Animal Yoga
Two-Bar Almost Instant Band
Amazing Drumming Monkeys
Little Notes
Fairy Jem
Ndorse
Arty Brellas Magic
Phil Doncon's Paint Storm
Playback Theatre
Totes Ridic
Great Hastings and Millie Taylor
Star-Trackers
Wood Shed
Morning Wake Up with Taoist Tai Chi
Mother Hen's Coop
Zen Garden
Yoga and Sound Meditation
Tranquila
Fairbridge Labyrinth/Mandala
Rainbow Yogis
Animal Yoga
Yogateens
Waagyl

2015
The 2015 festival was held 10–12 April. The acts were:

All Our Exes Live in Texas
Liz Stringer
John Bennett
David Francy
Lucy Wise Trio
Grimick
The Royal Parks
Rowena Wise
Jordie Lane
Oh Pep!
Amanda Merdzan
Kiersten & Cionne Fage
The Woods
Joe Flisco & Erik Nowden
Bill Lawrie & Paul Gioia
Jane Germain and the Lazy Boys
The Bombadils
John Flanagan
Luke Plumb & Peter Daffy
Katie J White
Nullabor Mountain Boys
Harry Jakamarra
Nuala Kennedy Band
Tolka
Santa Taranta
Kvonn
King George Sounds
Co-Cheol
Stephen Taberner
The Spooky Men of the West
Ross Vegas
The Jessica Stewart Few
Innes
The String Contingent
The Lammas Tide
Sparrow
Nodes
Raksha
The Bearded Gypsy Band
Miracle Band X
The Crooked Fiddle Band
The Rogues
Ungus Ungus Ungus
Kallidad
Odette Mercy and her Soul Atomics
Koi Child
London Klezmer Quartet
DVA
Eastwinds
The Black Chooks
Gerard Mapstone & Dalecana Flamenco Company
Baka Beyond
Feel the Manouche
Czech DVA
Mic Conway's National Junk Band
Bruce Watson
Rob Barratt
Greg Champion
Dark Horses
Amanda Merdzan
The Bearded Gypsy Band
The Crooked Fiddle Band
Czech DVA
Harry Jakamarra
In Za Loop Hoop Dance
Kallidad
Katie J White Band
Kiersten & Cionne Fage
Koi Child
The Lammas Tide
Miracle Band X
Nodes
Oh Pep!
Raksha
Ross Vegas
The Royal Parks
Rowena Wise
Tolka
Ungus Ungus Ungus
The Woods
Quest Winners
Scotch Youth Voices
Kidz Kaperz
Glenn B Swift
Magic Mic
Love Case Suit Nut
In Za Loop Hoop Dance
Thurtinkle
Sensational Storytelling Presents Many Moons
The Jessica Stewart Few Kids Show
Kinetica
Rastelli
Spare Parts Puppet Theatre
Storytelling with the Lucy Wise Trio
Camara Story
The Spooky Men Kids Show
Kids in the Kitchen
Baba Lala
Morning Wake Up with Taoist Tai Chi
Yoga in the Loft
Rainbow Yogis
Animal Yoga
Yogateens
Mother Hen's Coop
Tranquila
Fairbridge Labyrinth/Mandala
Brendan Darby
Roly Skender

2014

Adrian Edmondson and the Bad Shepherds
Ami Williamson
Ange Takats
Animal Yoga
Argentine Tango with Dania Percy
Baba Lala
Ballpoint Penguins
Barons of Tang, the
Bernard Carney and David Hyams
Bohemian Nights
Carolina Cordeiro
China Doll
Chinook
Chipolatas, the
Coco de Mer - Sounds of the Seychelles
Cole & Van Dijk
Coolgrass
Dave Johnson
David Hyams and the Miles to Go Band
David Lazarus
Dingo's Breakfast
Eleanor McEvoy
Ensemble Formidable
Equus
Fay White and Jane Thompson
Formidable Vegetable Sound System
Funkalleros
Gina Williams and Guy Ghouse - Kalyakool
Glenn B Swift
Glenn Rogers
Go for 2&5 Cooking Classes
Grace Barbé 
Gurpeet Singh
Hairball Street Theatre
Himmerland
Hot Paprika
Irish Ceilidh with Hillary McKenna
Jaaleekay
Jane Thompson
Jonathan Brain
Junior
Kamerunga
Kids with Wolves
Kingsley Dawes and the Jo King Cloggers
Labyrinth/Mandala at Fairbridge
Le Chant Des 
Les Caramelles
The Littlest Fox
Lucy and Roma, Kayaan Djildjit, Koodjal Djildjit
Mad Tatters
Mick Thomas and Squeezebox Wally
Morgan Bain
Mr Shaggles Circus World
Mucky Duck Bush Band
Nadis
Nick Charles
Ochre
Ozmosis
Pepperjacks, the
Perch Creek Family Jug Band, the
Percussion Experience
Perth Morris Men
Perth Scottish Fiddlers
Poques Tribute Showcase
The Quest Winners
Rainbow Yogis
Rory McLeod
Rushah Eggleston
Ruth Roshan & Tango Noir
Sambaninstas
Sasta
Scotch College School Performance
Seals, the
Sensational Storytelling
Simone & Girlfunkle
Singing the Spirit
Siskin River
Stella Savy
Swing Zing Lindy Hop Workshop
Tara Tiba's "A Persian dream"
Terry Jones Fairy Tales
Timothy Nelson & The Infidels
Tingley Turner
Tirthankar Banerjee
Turlku Birni
Women in docs
Yoga in the Loft
Yogateens

2013
The 2013 festival was held 26–28 April. The acts were:

A.J. Leonard
Afrique Acoustic
Afrotonic
Amazing Drumming Monkeys
Andrew Winton
Animal Yoga
Baba Lala
Battlers' Ballad
Belleville - Gypsy Swing
Bernard Carney
Black Choks, the
Black Diamond Trio
Bluegrass Parkway
BordererS, the
Bossa Pura
Brow Hall Orchestra, the
Carmel and Lindsay
China Doll
Circle Dance
Community Mandala/Labyrinth
Company, the
Cubbihouse
Daramad
Dilip n the Davs
Dreamcatchers
Enda Kenny Band
Evan & Mischa
Flap!
Frank Yamma
Glenn B Swift
Gleny Rae Virus and her Tamworth Playboys
Go For 2&5 Adult Cooking Classes
Go For 2&5 Children's Cooking Classes
Go For 2&5 Youth Cooking Classes
Hairball Theatre
Hilary McKenna - Ceili Dancing
Hot Paprika
Hussy Hicks
Iris
Jam Tarts
James Teague
Jay Grafton
Jennifer Renee
Jordan McRobbie
Junkadelic Brass band
Justin Walshe Folk Machine, the
Keszkeno Hungarian Folk Dance Group
Kevin Dempsey
Kidz Kaperz
Kristina Olsen
Lalique
Last Five Coins and Perth International Dance
Loaded Dog
Let's Make a Fairytale
Loren Kate
Lucy Wise and The B'Gollies
Mcmaster/Hay
Mad Tatters Morris (Dancing)
Mae Trio, the
Mama Kin
Mitch Becker
Morgan Bain
Morning Meditation with David Rivett
Morris & the Cuttlefish
Moving Bodies Workshop
Needing Cherie
Neil Adam and Judy Turner
Neal Boba's Bustamento
Nylon Zoo
Paul Gioia Band
Perth Morris Men
Perth Tango Embrace
Phillip Walley Stack
Poet's Breakfast
Pribumi Dance Indonesia
Pugsley Buzzard
The Quest Winners
Rhys Wood and the Self-Righteous Brothers
Sam and Lucy's Hawaiian Adventures
Saruzu Quartet, the
Seeds of The Sea
Sensational Storytelling
Sexteto Zona Sul
Singing the Spirit
Singing with the Faeries
Squeebz
Steve and Ros Barnes with Gary Burke
Stoney Joe
Stream Contingent
Taoist Tai Chi Society of Australia morning wake up
Them Little Secret
Tinpan Orange
toobaboo
Unfriendly Dragon, the
Vardos
Village Vibes Tribal Dance Band
Xave Brown
Yoga in the Loft
Yogateens
Zap Circus

2012
The 2012 festival was held 13–15 April. The acts were:

Adam Hall and the Velvet Playboys
Adrian Barker
Alaana & Alicia
Andrew Winton
Andy White
Animal Yoga
April Verch Band
Australian Institute of Theatresports
Baba Lala
Ballpoint Penguins
Be the change - Awakening the Dreamer
Big Rory and Ochie
Blue Celts
Blue Lucy
BluGuru
Button Moon
Carl and Parissa - The Hottentots
Carl Cleves
Carus Thompson & Band
Chipolatas, The
Chris While and Julie Matthews
Conservation Council
Dave Johnson
Dave Mann
David and Liz Rivett
David Hyams Finale Band-Commission
David Ross McDonald
Dry Bones
Ensemble Formidable
Fairbridge Eco-Village
Fancy Brothers, The
Five Point Turn
Flamenco Puro
Fling
Flying Heart Productions
Fred Smith and Liz Frencham
George Walley
Glen Be Swift
Go For 2 + 5 Cooking Workshops
Good-Time Stompers
Gospel Sing
Great Gardens
Hairball Theatre
Irish Sessioners
Jane Germain, Ian Simpson & John Reid
Jenny M. Thomas solo
Jeri Foreman, Paddy Montgomery and Daniel Watkins
Joe Black Trio
Jook Joint Band
Jude Iddison and Craig Sinclair
Jugularity
Kavisha
Kwela Swingsters
Last Five Coins and Perth International Folk Dance Group
Lemonwise
Linsey Pollak
Lucy Wise and Mischa Herman
MacClarke's Gray Vest
Madjiti Moorna
Mal Webb
Mattias Perez Trio
Mighty Camelot, The
Miles to Go Trio, The
Miriam Lieberman and friends
Mucky Duck Bush Band
My Friend the Chocolate Cake
Old Time Sing-a-long
Perth Morris Men
Perth Scottish Fiddlers
Poet's Breakfast
Rachel & Henry Climb a Hill
Rich and Famous
Robert Zielinski and Mick Doherty
Rocket Girl
Sambanistas
Samuel J Dass
Scott Wise
Seals, the
Sensational Storytelling
Seth Lakeman
Shane Howard
Shooglenifty
Shortis and Simpson
Simpson Three, The
Solar Oven Cooking
Spooky Men of the West
Stefan Grossman
Stiff Gins
Su Hart
Suitcase Circus
Sunshine Brothers
Speaker's Spots
Swing Academy
Tang-e-lang
Taoist Tai Chi Society
Ten Cent Shooters
Tjupurru
Totally Gourdgeous
TradDisco
Wadumbah Aboriginal Dance Group
Western Australia Police Pipe Band
Wise Family
Woohoo Revue, The
Yoga in the Loft
YogaTeens
Youth cooking

2011
The 2011 festival was held 29 April – 1 May. The acts were:

Andy Irvine and Rens van der Zalm
Ange Takats
Animal Yoga
Anything Is Valid Dance Theatre (AIVDT)
Australian Institute of Theatre Sports
Ayers Rock Surf Lifesaving Club
Bernard Carney
Bernard Carney and David Hyams
Big Old Bears
Bluegrass Parkway
Brett Campbell
Brow Horn Orchestra, the
C.A.S.E.
Captain Cleanup
Circle of Rhythm
Company Gongoma
Cooking for you - Go for 2 & 5 Youth Cooking Classes
Creature feature - Flea Circus Productions
Dance 4 Africa
Daramad Quartet with bellydancer Rose
Dark Horses (Flossie Malavialle and Keith Donnelly)
David and Liz Rivett
David Hyams and the Miles to Go Band
Dingo's Breakfast Oz Music and Poetry Band
Doris
Dunumba
Evelyn's Secret
Fiddleinquents
Fiona Scott-Norman
Flossie Malaiville
FourPlay String Quartet
Frank Jones and the Western Furphies
Funkarillaz
George Jackson and Davydd McDonald
George Walley and Friends
Glenn Swift
Go For 2 & 5 Children's Cooking Workshops
Go Set, the
Good Lovelies, the
Gospel Big Sing
Grace Barbe Afro-Kreol
Great Dave, the
GypRock Uke jam
Gypsie Howls, the
Helens Yoga in the loft
Ian Lowe
Joseph Tawadros Trio
Junkadelic Big Band
Justin Walshe Folk Machine, the
Kameruga
Katie Campbell
Keith Donnelly
Kim Churchill
Leapin' Louie
Little Notes
Lonely Brothers, the
Loren and Wirebird
Lucy Wise and the B'Gollies
Martin Pearson
Martin Pearson and The MP3
Martyn Wyndham Read and Iris Bishop
Mike Compton
Minky G and the Effects
Miriam Lieberman
Morgan Bain Band
Old time sing-a-long
OrganiK Dance
Pepperjacks, the (The Peppercorns and the Skipjacks)
Perth International Dancers
Perth Morris Men
Peter Ella
Portaloos, the
Read Juliet
Riccardo Tesi and Banditaliana
Robert Zielinski
Ross Vegas (Musical)
Royal Wedding Frockathon
Runskull
Sensational Stiltwalking and Storytelling
Shirlee Sunflower Show, the
Simon Kelly and the Lonely Wives
Skip Jacks, the
Southern Right Males
Stephen Lalor
String Contingent, the
Summerhouse
Swing Academy
Tin Dog
Toby
Trio Alegra & the Velvettes
Volatinsky Trio, the
Warren Fahey and the Larrikins
West O' The Moon
Wonderfuls, the
Yogateens
Zigatango

2010
The 2010 festival was held 9–11 April. The acts were:

Adam Hall & The Velvet Playboys
Andrew Cronshaw & Ian Blake
Andrew Winton
Animal Yoga
Anything is Valid Dance Theatre (AIVDT)
Arte Kanela Flamenco
Australian Institute of Theatresports
Ballpoint Penguins
Barons of Tang, the
Beleza
Beppe Gambetta
Boo Hewerdine
Cahoots Cajun Down Under
Carolann
Chipolatas
Club Qahira
Crossbow
Daniel Champagne
Dave Mann Collective
Dingo's Breakfast
Dream State Circus
Dva
Echoes of Djanga
Eddi Reader
Elk Bell
Fancy Brothers, the
Fiddle Chicks
Five Point Turn
Genticorum
George Walley et al.
Giant Seagulls
Gilbert Whyte
Glenn Swift
Go For 2+5 Children's Cooking Workshops
Go For 2+5 Youth cooking
Gospel Big Sing
Greg Sheehan
Gypsy Ukulele Workshop
Helen's Yoga in the Loft
Hot Paprika
Hussy Hicks
Iris
Isabel
James Keelaghan and Hugh McMillan
Jane Germain & The Yahoos
Junior
Keszkeno Hungarian Folk Dance Group
Khin Myint
Lanterns
Last Five Coins, the
Lemonwise
Little Notes
Lucky Oceans and the Darling Rangers
Mara!
Martin and Shan Graebe
Michael Kennedy
Mucky Duck Bush Band
Nano Stern
Nathan Kaye
Old time Sing-a-long
Peppercorns, the
Perth International Dancers
Play Music By Breathing
Prita
Real Sing, the
Richard Niyoyankuze & The Burundi Children's Choir
Sally Dastey
Sensational Stiltwalking
Shout Sustainability talks
Simon Kelly Band
Souleiado French Dance Group
Southern Right Males
Spiderfish Stew
Spooky Tales
Storycatcher
String Theory
Sugar Blue Burlesque
Suitcase Circus
Swing It
Taal Naan
Ten Cent Shooters
Tetrafide + Temple of Fine Arts 'Spice' dance show
Three Tunes, the
Tin Dog
Tingley Turner
Toby
Tom McConville
Vin Garbutt
Wadumbah Noongar Dance Group
Westwood
Yoga Teens
Zap Circus

2009
The 2009 festival was held 17–19 April. The acts were:

Alan Banks
Amazing Drumming Monkeys
Ancestrais Brazilian Capoeira and Samba
Andrew Clairmont Supper Club
Animal Yoga
Anything is Valid Dance Theatre
Ashley Elizabeth Rodier
Ayers Rock Surf Livesaving Club, the
Bajalay Suso
Bandish
Beenies, the
Beez, the
Bernard and Eleanor Carney
Bernard Carney and David Hyams
Bianca Jade
Big Rory
Blue Genes Family Band
Bluegrass Parkway
Brenda Chapman & Friends
Camelot Choir
Carus Thompson
Cecil and Marie-Anne Pontre
Charlie Jones Ukulele Workshop
Chris White and Julie Matthews
Craig Werth
Crunchkin Crew Puppets, the
Dance 4 Africa
Dave Hellens
Dave Mann Collective
David Francey
David Ross McDonald
Dell Fuego
Dev'lish Mary
Diana Clark Trio
Djangle
Doug de Vries
Dreamcatchers
Dunumba
Elegant Pedlars, the
Faerd
Fiddleinquents
Fling, the
Flying Carpathians, the
Flying Heart Productions
Folk of the Puppetree, the
Free Spirit Gypsy Tribal
George Walley
Go For 2+4 Children's Cooking Workshop
Go for 2 & 5 Youth Cooking Classes
Gospel Sing
haBiBis, the
Hall Family Trio
Harry James Angus
Hedge Bandits Junkedelic Collective, the
Hilary McKenna
Inka Marka
James Michael Thompson
Jonathan Brain
Josh Bennett
Kate Rowe
Keszkeno Dance Croup
Kidz Kapers
Kris Arnott and band
Last Five Coins, the
Lawnmowers,
Lazy Railway, the
Little Notes
Lonely Brothers, the
Loren Kate
Louie Prez trio
Mal Webb
Mark Cain Instrument Making
Matt Gresham
Mic Conway (solo)
Mic Conway with Clarke's Grey Vest
Mick O'Neill
Miles to Go Band, the
Mindfulness Meditation
Minna Raskinen
Naomi Pigram
Natasha Bouchard
Old Man Luedecke
Old Spice Boys, the
Paul Robert Burton and Andrew Toner
Peel Scottish Fiddlers
Perth International dancers
Pert Mod Gypsy Brass Band
Peter Brandy
Peter Combe
Pierre Bensusan
Poets' Breakfast
Pot'n'Kettle
Remembering Nick Drake
Rose Barker
Rumskull
Ruth Hazleton
Sabroson Latin Big Band
Sambanistas
Saritah
Saz Lockyer
Schola Cantori
Sensational Stiltwalking and String
Sneaky Weasel Gang
Souleiado French Dance Group
Spooky Men of the West
Stephen Taberner
Suburban Songstories with Simon Nield (short film)
Sue Cunningham
Suitcase Circus
TheatreSports
Tinpan Orange
Torchlight Trembles
Totally Gourdgeous
Undesirables, the
Valanga Khoza
Victor Valdes
Voicemale
Voices from the Tomb
Waranga
Warrdong
West Coast Blues Club Showcase
Wise Family Band
Wise Girls
Xave Brown
Yoga in the loft
Yogateens
Zebra Crossing
Zen Group of Western Australia

2008
The 2008 festival was held from 24 to 27 April 2008. The acts were:

Adam Hall and the Velvet Playboys
Aiden Varro
Alan Banks
Alex Legg
Aminah Hughes
Andy Copeman
Andy Rigby and Friends
Animal Yoga
Australia Council Grants Information Session
Ballpoint Penguins
Barking Frank Valentine
Bellyfusion
Ben Zabbia
Blue Celts
Blues Harmonica Workshop
Bluetongue Bush Ceilidh
Boo-Boo and Bender
Bruce Watson Trio
Camelot Chorale
Cameron Proctor Rock'n' Roll
Camoon
Carl Cleves
Chameleon Brass Band
Cheeky monkey pre-school circus
Chloe Hall
Chris Duncan and Catherine Strutt
Clarks Grey Vest
Coolgrass
Craig Sinclair and Lara Norman
Danny Spooner
Diamond Dave and the Doodaddies
Doris
Double Entendre
Dream Catchers
enQ
Ernie Gruner
Fatt Matt
Fiddleinquents
Five Point Turn
Flying Heart Productions
Freya Hanly and That Brutal Moon
Glenn B Swift
Go for 2&5 Children's Cooking Classes
Go for 2&5 Youth Cooking Classes
Gugge Burras
Hassan Youssef Dervish Folkloric Group
Highland Lassies
Hilary McKenna
Hora Shalom Dances of Israel
The Hottentots
Irini Vela
Jane Germaine and the Yahoos
Jane Saunders and Michael Fix
Jenny M Thomas
Jenny Simpson
Jenny Simpson Gospel Choir
Jesse the Wind Wanderer
Jonathan Brain and the Captains of Industry
Judy Small
Jugularity
Junior
Kavisha Mazzella Trio
Keszkeno Hungarian Folk Dance Group
Kieran Halpin
Klezmeritis
The Last Five Coins
The Last Supper Club
The Librarian of Basra
Lillypilly Storytelling
Little Notes
Loaded Dog
Louisa Wise
Love, Actually
Lucy Wise and Jack Wilson
Mal Webb
Mandy Connell
Matt Gresham
MC Jeazed
The Mermaids Daughter
Michael Fix
Mike De Velta
Miles To Go Trio
Milltown
Mindfulness Meditation
Monsieur Camembert
Mr. Sister
Ngewell Kora Group
Ochre
Ozmosis
Ozmosis Streetband
Parissa Bouas
Patrick Davies
Paul Gioia Trio
Pedlar's Tales
Perth International Dancers
Perth Morris Men
Pigram Brothers (3-Piece)
Poets' Breakfast
Psallite
Pyro Flowers
Rich'n'Famous
Roger Montgomery And Friends
Rory McLeod
Sambanistas
Saz Lockyer
Scott Wise
Simon Kelly Band
Simon Nield
Slap My Thighs and Call Me Barbara
Sneaky Weasel Gang
Songwriting Group Showcase
Stiff Gins
Strat and Lyndal
Sugar Blue Burlesque
Suitcase Circus Make a Circus
Swing It
Tales of Terrible Deeds
Tangled Reel
Telescopic Roger
Ten Cent Shooters
Theatresports
Tin Dog
Tinpan Orange Trio
Tonshi McIntosh
Trembling Tales By Torchlight
Vasek School for Violin and Strings
Velveteen
Wadumbah Noongar Dance Group
Western Australia Police Pipe Band
Wise Family Band
The Wise Girls
Yogateens
Yoga with Andrea
Yuval Ashkar
Zigatango
Zulya and the Children of the Underground

2007
The 2007 festival was held from 13 to 15 April 2007. The announced performers were:

Adrian Barker
Alistair Hulett and Dave Swarbrick
Amazing Drumming Monkeys
Andrew Winton
Andrew Winton Trio
Animal Yoga
Ballpoint Penguins
Barking Gecko Theatre Company
Ben Stevenson
Bernard Carney
Big Island Jam
Blue Celts
Bluegrass Parkway
Bob Dylan Late Night Review
Bougainville Sky (documentary film)
Burke & Grills
Canto Sikuri
Captain Quirk (CIRQUEL)
Carrol Hall Michelle Hall and Daniella Daniels
Carus
Cheeky Monkey Pre-School Circus
Chipolatas
Clarke's Gray Vest
Club Loft Folk Club
Cook Islands Dance Group
Craig Sinclair
Cycology (Linsey Pollak)
Dave Brewer
Dave Swarbrick
The Dingle Delta: the Blues in Celtic Music
Djiva (was Yowarliny)
Doc Jones Lechery Orchestra
Double Entendre
Dream Catchers
Enda Kenny Band
Fiddle Fever
Five Point Turn
The Fling & The Celtic Summit
Frank Jones (and the Western Furphies)
Fred Graham
Fred Smith
Frencham Smith
Freya Hanly and her String Quartet
Gaelic Abandon
Gary Collinson and Dave Billing
Glenn B Swift
Glenn Rogers
Go for 2&5 Children's Cooking Classes
Go for 2&5 Youth Cooking Classes
Grace Barbe & the Seychelles Rhythms
Graham Seale
Great Scott Circus
Gugge Burras
Guitar Heaven
Harry Power & the Boy Bushranger
Hawaiinot
Heads We're Dancing
Hilary McKenna
Hoddle
IndoGypsy
Iris
Jeff Lang
Jigzag
Joe Ferguson
Just Fiddling
Kate Burke and Ruth Hazleton
Keszkeno Dance Group
Lindsay Martin
Linsey Pollak
Lonely Brothers, the
Loren and the Grow Your Owns
Loren Kate
The Mammals
Marcus Sturrock
Midnight Mahina
Mike and Lesley
Mike Jackson
Mindfulness Meditation
Miss Donna the Clown
Mr. Sister (featuring Mel Robinson)
Mukti
Mystery Pacific
Narasirato Pan Pipers
Nick Charles
Pacific Curls
Pascal
Pearlers - songs of the Pearling Industry
Pedlar's Tales
Peel Scottish Fiddlers
Pelangi
Pethr Morris Men
Peter Bugden
Pigswill Boys, the
Pirate Party - me Hearties
Poets Breakfast
Pulse Youth Performance Co.
Rebetiki
Red Clydeside
Rob Willis - Veranda Music
Rock'n' Roll'n Kids with Cameron
Rod Vervest
Rose and Wattle
Rhythm  & Cle
Sabroson
Saltwater Band
The Sambanistas
Sean Doherty
Sensational Stiltwalking
Sensational String Stories
Sid de Burgh
Simon Nield
The Sirocco Tribe
Sit Down Cedric
Souleiado French Dance Group
Spooky Men of the West
Squirt
State library of WA and National Library of Australia
Stephen Taberner
Steve Cook
Strangers on the Shore
Summerhouse
Tallest String Tower
Telescopic Roger
TetraFide Percussion
TheatreSports
Tin Dog
Tok Pan Tok
Tom Kearns
Tony Petrandonakis
Trio Grosso
Trouble in the Kitchen
Tulca Mor
WA Police Pipe Band
Wairua Tipuna
Your Really Great Aunt and Friends
ZARM
Zen Group of Western Australia
Zigatango

2006
The 2006 festival was held 21–23 April. The acts were:

A Case of Blue: songs of Joni Mitchell
Aaron Peden
Aladdin Fun Magic Show
Alegrias Spanish Dance Ensemble
All the World is an Enchanted Stage
An Afternoon at the Races
Andrew Winton
Andy Copeman
Andy Rigby
Angus Grant
Animal Yoga
Balvindar Singh
Barking Gecko Theatre Company
Barnes Family Band
Ben Witt & Harley Burke
Bernard Bolan
Bindjareb Middars
Black Nonnas, (Commedia Academy)
Blackwood
Blue Celts
Bron Ault-Connell
Captain Quirk
Carney Family Band, The
Carrol Hall, Michelle Hall & Danellia Daniels
Chris While & Julie Matthews
City Farm Chameleon Brass Band
Cloudstreet
Colum Sands
Craig Sinclair
Cuarteto Faro
Curl
Danni Stefanetti
Dave Clarke
The Family Bands
Dave Mann Collective
David Hyams and the Miles To Go Band
Diamond Dave and the Doodaddies
Dougal Adams and Ormonde Waters
Eric Kowarski
Fagans, the
Fay White
Fiddle Fever
Fiddlleinquents
Flute N Veg
Funky String Band, the
Gary Collinson
Glenn B Swift
Go For 2&5 Youth Cooking Classes
Go For 2&5 Children's Cooking Classes
Gospel Concert
Greg Hastings
Guitar Heaven
Handfull of Soul
Hey Presto comedy magic
Home Brew
Hora Shalom Dances of Israel
Howard Family, the
Ilan Zagoria and Troy Gennoe
Jane Cornes and Margie Hanly
Jelly Belly & Illusions of Isis
John Whaite Dance Workshop
Joni Mitchell, songs of
Judy Turner
Kate Fagan
Kavisha Mazzella
Keszkeno Dance Group
Khin Mynt
Kidz Kaperz Concert
Kidz Comedy Kaperz
Last Five Coins, The
Livingston Thudpucker
Loren and the Grow Your Owns
Luke Plumb
Mickey J (aka Michael Johnson)
Mike Cooper
Mr Sister (featuring Mel Robinson)
Mount Hawthorn Primary School
Mucky Duck Bush Band
Nabarlek
Nancy Kerr and James Fagan
Nautilus Band (Barnes, While and Matthews)
Never the Twain
New Dogs Old Tricks
Ngewell Kora Group
Ozmosis
Pascale
Paul Gioia
Paul Tanner
Peel Fiddlers
Peel Scottish fiddlers
Pepitas, The
Perth International Dances
Peter Capp
Pigram Brothers
Pink and White Bridge
Pioneers, the
Poets Breakfast
Pria Schwall-Kearney
Psallite
Pulse Youth Performance Company
Puppet Folk
Really Great Aunt
Reg Bolton Circus Workshops
Riders, The
Rigby Thompson Family Band
Rose Bygrave
Royal Scottish Country Dance Society
Roztiazhka Cossacks Dancers
Sambanistas
Sensational String Stories
Shane Howard
Shangara Jive
Silent Partner
Simon Fox
Sit Down Cedric
St Agnes
Stilt-Walker Extraordinaire
StringyBach
Summerhouse
Tali White
Tecoma
Telescopic Roger
Ten Cent Shooters
Teresa and Jen
TheatreSports
Those Bloody McEnnas
Tribal Astronaut
Tria Alegra
Unhinged Symphony
Variety Youth Choir
WA Heritage and Colonial Dancers
Wadumbah Aboriginal Dance Group
Walin' Jennys, The
Waiting for Guinness
Warnbro Community High School Concert Band
White Family, The
Winton Family Band
Wise Barn Owls, The
Wise Family Band, The
Wise Girls & Friends
Women in docs
Young Performers Showcase
Zen Group of WA
Zrinjski Croatian Dance Group

2005
The 2005 festival was held 15–17 April. The acts were:

Accidental Trio
Andrew Clermont
Andrew Winton
Bad Hair Day
A Balloon Is a Baboon!
The Ballpoint Penguins
Band of Angels Gospel Choir with Hot Gospel Big Band
Barnes Family
Belladonna the Witch
Ben Stephenson
Bernard Carney
Bluegrass Parkway
Bob Fox
Bougainville Sky
Bruce Mathiske
Buzz Dance Theatre
Cahoots Cajun-Down-Under
Carl Pannuzzo
Carmol Charlton
Carus & the True Believers
Colcannon
Comedia Academy
Cuarteto Farol
Dammit Janet
Danni Stefanetti
Diamond Dave and the Doodaddies
Diana Clark
Dingoes Brunch (with special guest Roger Montgomery)
Doch
Doris
Doug de Vries
Doug de Vries & Diana Clark
Elena Higgins
EmmA-Bee
Fiddle Fever
Fiddlinquents
Fiona Boyes
Flip 'n Flop Circus
Fred Smith and Liz Frencham
Funk Junktion
Gina Williams
Glenn Swift
Go For 2 & 5 Children's Cooking Classes
Go For 2 & 5 Youth Cooking Classes
Great Scott
Guitar Heaven
Homebrew
Hora Shalom Dances of Israel
Iris
Jane Brownlee Duo
Jane Germain, John Reed and Reuben Kooperman
Jessica Ipkendanz
Jody Martin with Robyn Martin
The Joys of the Women
Junkadelic
Kashtany Duo with Ivanna Mayorenko
Keith Donnelly
Kidz Kaperz
Kidz Komedy Kaperz
Kukuleczka Polish Folk Dancing Group
Last Five Coins, the
Laura Bernay
The Laws
Libbyah Queen of the Desert Belly Dancers
Loaded Dog
Louisa Wise
Magic Davo
Mall Webb
Marcus Bancroft
Marimba Magic
MegaMike
Melaleuca Road
Micadelic
Notes from Matron
Ochre
Ormonde Waters and Dougal Adams
Ozmosis
Oz Songwriters' Summit
Paul Gioia
Penelope Swales
Peter Willey
Pioneers, the
Pulse Youth Performance Co
Puppet Folk - the making of the little people
Raggabeats
The Retro Chef
Rose and Wattle English Country Dancing
Ruth and Lucy Wise
Salt Creek
Sambanistas Street Percussion and Community Arts Group
Saritah
Scott Wise
Sean Keane
Sensational String Figures
Sensitive New Age Cowpersons
Simon Neild
Sit Down Cedric
Slap My Thighs and Call Me Barbra
Souleiado French Dancing
Spooky Men of the West
Staying in Touch
Stephen Taberner
Steve and Roz Barnes
Storytelling Guild of WA
Tangled Reel
Ten Cent Shooters
Tenzin Choegyal
Tetrafide Percussion
Theatresports
Tom Walwyn
Tony McManus and Alain Genty
Totally Gourdgeous
Tyrrell Squirrel & Co Travelling Puppet Troupe
Wadumbah Aboriginal Dance Group
WALA
Warnbro Community High School Senior Concert Band
Warrdong Aboriginal Cultural Experience
Wise Family Band
Wishgiving Fairies
Xenos
Yarnspinners' Contest

2004
The 2004 festival was held 16–18 April. The acts were:

Afrique Acoustic
Aladdin Fun Magic Show
Andrew Clermont
Andrew Winton
Anneka's PianoEasy
Ballpoint Penguins, the
Beach, the
Binjarreb Middar Dance Group
Blair Greenberg
Blended Reds
Bluegrass Parkway
BobBrozman
Borderers, the
Bruce Watson
Bubblemania
Bush Olympics, the
Canto Sikuri
Capswain
Catalan Festa Major Dance
Chojo Jaques
Christy O'Leary and Bert Deivert
Dave Clarke
Dave Mann Collective, The
David Hyams and the Miles To Go Band
Deep Water Blue
Dingo's Breakfast Oz Music & Poetry Band
DJ Funktions
Donal Baylor
Doris
Duo Lenz
Dya Singh
Earthwise Junkadelic
Fairbridge Village Activities
Ferguson and Downes
Fiddle Fever
Fiddlelinquents, the
Flip'n'Flop Circus
George Walley and Knotwork
Gina Williams
Greg Hastings
Guitar Heaven
Iris
James Nash
Judy Turner
Ju/z and Friends
Kavisha Mazzella
Kinetic Theatre
Kismet Tribe, the
Kristina Olsen & Peter Grayling
Latin Gypsy Experiment
Lee West
Lois Olney
Louisa Wise
Magic Pirate, the
Mandoline Affaire
Mandomania
Margret RoadKnight
Mark Cain and Tim Chambers
Merri-May Gill
Midnight Mahina
Mike Jackson
Mucky Duck Bush Band
Neil Adam
Neil Adam & Judy Turner
Old Spice Boys, the
Parenthood Concert
Paul Gioia
Perth Accordion Orchestra
Perth International Dancers
Peta Lithgo & Malaika
Pete Morton
Pirates' Breakfast
Poets' Breakfasts
Pony Rides
Real Sing, the
Reg Bolton Suitcase Circus
Retro Chef
Salt Flat Trio
Sambanistas Street Percussion and Arts Group
Saritah
Scott Wise
Seychelles Cultural Group
Sheik to Sheik Bellydancers
Simon Nield
Slap My Thighs and Call Me Barbra
Sol y Luna
Staying in Touch
Steve and Ros Barnes
Stevie Coyle
Street Beat Productions
Taking the Pith
Tangled Reel
Tatterjack - Fairbridge Festival Special
Ten Cent Shooters
TheatreSports
Tin Dog
Toby and Code-Red
Trio Alegra
Trio Grosso and Friends
Twixter Gang, the
Tyrrell Squirrel & Co Travelling Puppet Troupe
Ulli Kec
Valanga Khoza and Leo Dale
Vardos
voicepopfoible
Wadumbah Aboriginal Dance Group
Waybacks, the
Wise Family band
Woman to Woman
Working Voices
Yunyu
Zen Group of Western Australia

2003
The 2003 festival was held 24–27 April. The acts were:

Accidental Trio
Akasa
Amanda McKenna Dance Workshop
Andrew Winton
Andy Copeman
Andy Copeman – The Spelman Project
Andy Rigby
Anna-Wendy Stevenson
Anneka Sparkes Simply Music Piano / Keyboard Workshop
Anvilmagic
The Anzacs... Over Here... Over There...
Ayesha Bellydance
Baamba Alert
Band of Angels Gospel Choir
The Bayou Brothers
B-Boy Jet and Aerial Assault
Bernard Carney
Binjarreb Middar Dance Group
Blackwood
Blair Greenberg
Blanche Dubois
Bob Fox
Bomba
Cahoots Cajun Dance Band
Caoilte O’Suilleabhain
Carus
Clarks Grey Vest
Class Act Theatre
Colin Smiley Paddy Connolly and Friends
Comhaltas Celhaltas Eireann
The Crank Squad Dance Party
Creative Writing with Janes Cornes
Curl
Danni Stefanetti
Dave Johnson and the True Believers
Dave Mann Collective
David Hyams
David Hyams and the Miles To Go Band
Desert Child
Diamond Dave and the Doodaddies
Dingo's Breakfast Oz Music and Poetry Band
Don Smith
Dot Combo
Earthwise Junkadelic
Enjoy Healthy Eating Children's Cooking Classes
Enjoy Healthy Eating Youth Cooking Classes
Fairbridge Village Activities
Fine Friday
Fred Smith
Frenchman Smith
Gallipolis Story – Then and Now
Geordie McGargle and the Tentclearers
Ghawazee Girls
Glenn the Jester
Gospel Sing
Greek Dance Workshop
Guitar Heaven
Hazelton Cox and Coffin
Heads We're Dancing
The Hottentots
Iln Zagoria
Irish Session
Jandy Lowe
Jane Cornes
Jean Paul Bell
Jenny Simpson
Joel Smoker and the Red Dirt Band
Josivac
Julia and Dieta Bajzek
Julia Watson
Just Fiddling
Kath Tate
Kerrianne Cox
Knotwork
Kris Drever
The Last Five Coins
Laurel de Vietri and Souleiado
Le Paradis
Les Barker
Machitun
Machwood
The Madogalup Yahoo
Mandoline Affair
Margie Hanly
Mark Cain and Tim Chambers
Martin Pearson
Martin Tucker
Mary G
Mick Conway and Sultans
Mirrors Breath
Monsieur Camembert
Mose Scarlett
Mucky Duck Bush Band
Nick Hunter
Novak 'N Goode
Nuala Kennedy
Ochre
Patrick Cordia
Perth International Dancers
Peta Lithgo and Malaika
Peter Capp
Peter Hicks
Poetry in Action
Quinstruments
Quintessence
Rachel Hore
Rachel Taylor
The Real Sing
Reg Bolton Suitcase Circus
Revolving Creations
The Rhythm of the Women
Richie Pavledis
The Riders
Rod Vervest
Roger Montgomery
Ruby's Grace
Safety Bay SHS & Warnbro CHS Combined Band
Sambanistas
Scott and Louisa Wise
Scottish Country Dancing
Sensitive New Age Cowpersons
Seychelles Cultural Group
Sheva
Simon Fox
Splintered Timbre
Staying in Touch
Storytelling Guild of Australia (WA)
Stringy Bach
The Sultans
Tatterjack
Tears to Topicketty
Hey Egan and Nerrys Evans
Theatresports
Three
Tok Pan Tok
Tom Haran
Trilogy of Trans
Tuxedoo Junction
Urban Art Workshops
Wadumbah Aboriginal Dance Group
The Wah Trees
Watsons and Friends
Well Strong
Willi's Turf Band
Womensong – A Retrospective
World Series Poetry Debate
Yoga for Kids
Zen Group of Westerna Australia
Ziggy Bey Jan Group
Zydeco Hop Workshop

2002
The 2002 festival was held 19–21 April. The acts were:

Acupella Gals
Accidental Trio
Afghani Duo
Afrique Acoustique
Akapella Muna
Alistair Hulett
Andrew Clermont
Andy Copeman
Andy Copemanb with Corine Brokken
Archipelago
Ayesha and Desert Stars Bellydance
Belladonna the Wich
Beltane Fire
Bernard Carney
Bhartha Kala Bavanam, School of
Binjarreb Middar Dance Group
Bluegrass Parkway
Bob Rummery
Bomba
Bridge, The
Brimstone and Treacle
Bungarra
Cajun Fiddle Workshop
Carl Panuzzo
Carus Thompson
Catfish
Cianan
Cortinas, The
Crank Squad Dance Party, The
Curl
Desert Child
Diatonic
Dot Combo
Dragonfly Funky Fairy Band
Drummerdonnas
Duo Lenz Classical Guitar Duo
Easydance
Enfants de Provence, Les
Enjoy Healthy eating Children's Cooking Classes
Fagains, The
Fishing for Rainbows
Ghawazee Girls
Glen the Jester
Graham Seal
Greg Hastings
Gypsy Latin Experiment
Hay Rides
Hooked on Hessian
Interactive Storytelling with Amanda
Ishka Forte
James Fagan
Jenny Simpson
Jez Low and the Bad Pennies
Jigzag
John Reed
Jovial Crew, The
Judy Dinning
Jugularity
Jus Jump
Just Fiddling
Kate Bramley
Kate Fagan
Kia Tupu Rupe Rupe
Kids Choir
Klezmeritis
Lara Steven and the Deep Dead Blue
Last Five Coins, The
Loaded Dog
Lois Olney
Looweeze De'ath
Los Chasquis
Lotus Trio, The
Mal Web
Marcus Sturrock
Margaret and Jeff Morgan with Amanda
Margie Hanly
Meredith Higgins
Midnight Mahina
Mike Cooper
Mike Jackson
Murray Jennings
Nancy Kerr and James Fagan
Okay Bayou with John Whaite and Dinah
Penelope Swales
Perth International Folk Dance Group
Peter Cap
Poetry in Action
Poets Breakfast
Presha Poynte
Psallite
Randall Matthews
Reel Thing, The
Resonant Voice
Riders, The
River Watch Activity
Rod Vervest
Roger Montgomery
Rose Bygrave
Ruby's Grace
Salim Omar Salim
Sambanistas
Scott Wise
Scottish Country Dancing
Sean Kenan
Sean Kenan's Shadowplay
Seychelles Cultural Group
Simon Haworth
Simon Nield
Simply Music with Anneka Sparks
Steve and Ros Barnes
Steve Barnes
Storytelling Guild of Australia (WA)
Strangers on the Shore
Sultans, The
Tears to Picketty
Ted Egan
Ten Cent Shooters
Theatresports
Tin Dog
Tony McManus
Totally Gourdgeous
Trio Grosso, Psallite and Friends
Ulli Keck
Variety Duo
Vasek School Tour Ensemble
W.A. Mandolin Orchestra
Warnbro Community High School Training Band and the Dance Group
Well Strung
Wise Family Band
Women in Docs
World Series Poetry Debate
Yalla
Yoga for Kids
Zen Meditation
Zig Bey Jan Group

2001
The 2001 festival was held 20–22 April. The acts were:

African Music Congress
Aimee Leonard
An t-Eilean Mor
Andrew Clermont
As Yet Untold
Ayesha Belly Dance
Band of Angels Gospel Choir
Belladonna the Witch
Ben Stephenson (See Trouble in the Kitchen)
Bernard and Eleanor Carney
Bernard Carney
Bernard Carney and Peter Grayling
Big Gospel Sing
Bill Sunbury
Binjarreb Middar Dance Group
Blowin Puppets
Bluegrass Parkway
Bob Rummery
Bomba
Bubblemania
Burdett Simpson and Young
Cajun Dance Workshop
Canons and Rounds
Caravan
Chris While and Julie Matthews
Cianan
Cliff Ellery
Cortinas, the
Crocodile's Holiday Home
Dammit Janet
Damon Davies
David Hyams and the Miles to Go Band
Desert Child
Dingo's Breakfast
Don Smith
Donal Baylor
Dougal Adams
Dreamtime in the Peel see Joe Walley and Amanda Yates
Drummerdonnas
Easydance
EChO (Education Chamber Orchestra)
Edward de Bozo
Eireann Dancing School
Enda Kenney
Enda Kenney and Lindsay Martin
Enjoy Healthy Eating Cooking Classes
Fairbridge Heritage Tour
Faith Petric
Fiddle Fever
Fiddling Accountant, The
Flaming Butterflies, The
Gerry O'Bierne
Ghawazee Girls
Glenn B Swift
Greg Hastings
Guitar Heaven
Head's We're Dancing
Helen Moran and Johnny Huckle - see Shades of Brindle
Hooked on Hessian
Jenny Simpson
Jester, The
Jim Smith
Jimmy Young and James Wilkinson
Joe Walley and Amanda Yates
Joel Smoker
John Butler Trio
Julia Watson
Jus' Jump
Kashtany Duo
Kate Burke and Ruth Hazelton
Kath Tait
Kavisha Mazzella
Keith McHenry
Kids' Craft Club
Kidz Kaperz - Concerts by Young Performers
Kindred Sounds
Last Five Coins, The
Les EnFants de Provence
Lindsay Martin
Listen to the Magic
Lois Olney
Looweeze de'Ath
Louisa Wise
Mara!
Margaret Gunson & Louisa Wise
Mark Cain
Medieval Pleasures
Mic Conway
Nanna's Wonderful Chair
0rmonde Waters
Perth International Folk Dance Group
Peta Lithgo & Malaika with Ivanna
Peter Grayling
Poets' Breakfast
Poetry in Action
Pomegranate
Psallite
Rambling Bilbies
Real Sing, The
Richard Walley and Gary Ridge
Riley Lee
Riley Lee and Peter Grayling
Riverwatch
Roger Montgomery
Rory McLeod and Aimee Leonard
Rosie Johnstone
Royal Scottish Country Dance
Salim Omar Salim
Sambanistas
Scott & Louisa Wise
Scott Wise Blues Harmonica
Shades of Brindle
Sid de Burgh
Simon Nield
Steve Hammond & Band
Storytelling Guild of WA
Sultans, The
Suzuki Violin School
Ten Cent Shooters
The Pipes, The Pipes are Calling
Theatresports
Tin Dog
To Catch a Story by the Tale
Tok Pan Tok
Tom Walwyn
Trouble in the Kitchen
WAM Song
WA Romany Ternlpe Assn
Watson Family
White on Black
Whitfords Dance Centre
Wise Family Band
World of PVC Music - see Mark Cain
World Serles Poetry Debate
Zen Group of Western Australia

2000
The 2000 festival was held 14–16 April. The acts were:

Action acting
African Music Congress
Akappella Munda
Akin
Alan Welsh
Anatomy of the Guitar
Art of Food - See Linsey Pollak
Anvilmagic
Ayesah & the Desert Stars
Band of Angels Gospel Choir
Belladonna the Witch
Binjarreb Middar
Black Stump Bedlams
Bob Rummery and Phil Gray
Brief History of Wind
Bubblemania
Bungarra
Bush-it Artists
Cajun Dance Workshop
Caravaan
Catfish
Chipolatas
Chrysalis Creations
Dammit Janet
Dave McDonald
David Hyams and the Miles to Go Band
Dingo's Breakfast
Dogg Pound Posse
Don Smith
Donough O'Donovan
Dot Combo
Dougal and Lisa Adams
DrummerDonnas
Edward de Bozo
Eireann Dancing School
Fairbridge History
Flaming Butterflies
Fool Extent Circus
Fruit 'n' Veg Cooking Classes
Ghawazee Girls
Glenn B Swift 
Greenjacket
Greg Hastings
Guitars of the Americas
Hazelton Cox and Coffin
Hooked on Hessian
Hot Potatoes
Hottentot party
Ilan Zagoria
Jamie Mills
Jane Darcey
Jayker
Jenny Thomas
Jess & Joe Bargmann
John Burn
John Butler
Johnnie Miller
Julia Watson
Ken Ferguson
Kerrianne Cox
Kids' Craft Club
Kidz Kaperz - A Concert by Young Performers
Knotwork
Kristina Olsen
Kristina Olsen and Peter Grayling
Last Five Coins
Les Barker
Les Enfants de Provence
Linsey Pollak
Louisa Wise and Friends
Louisa Wise and Margaret Gunson
Lowry Olafson
Lowry Olafson Trio
Lucky Oceans
Lynn Hazleton
Magic Pirate
Maids of Perth
Marcus Sturrock
McClarke's Gray Vest
Melissa Raser Weed
Michael Kennedy
Mike and Lesley
Mike Horton
Mose Scarlett
Mystique Arabian Fantasy
Natalie Ripepi
Neil Adam
Meal Adam & Judy Turner
Nola Formentin
Not Enough Rope
Nova Ensemble
Ocean Choir, the
Olsen and Grayling
Parissa Bouas
Perth International Folk Dance Group
Perth Morris Men
Peter Clarke
Piping Hot
Polka.Com
Psalite
Quintessence
Resonant Voice
Richard French
Riverwatch Activity
Rose and Wattle Country Dancers
Royal Scottish Country Dance Society
Sambanistas Community Percussion
Samba Parade
Scope
Scott Wise
Sensitive New Age Cowpersons
Shane Howard
Shantyman, the
Simon Fox
Singing Sessions
Snakefoot
Songs in the Quay of Sea
Steve Scanlon
Storytelling Guild of WA
Sultans
Suzuki Method of Teaching
Suzuki Students in Concert
Suzuki Violin School Concert
Tamariki O Waimarama
Team Games
The Jester
Theatresports
Tin Dog
Tom Walwyn
Tour, Talk and Museum Visit
Tulipan
WAMI Song Contest
Watson Family
Waxing Lyrical
Wise Family Band
Workingman's Paradise
Zydecats

1999
The 1999 festival was held 9–11 April. The acts were:

Animal Touch Farm
Band of Angels Gospel Choir
Barnes, Ros
BBQ Breakfast with the Jesters
Bellydance workshop
Bedouin Celebration
Binjarreb Middar Dance Group
Blacksmith - Charl Nienebar
Black Stump Bedlams
Blight, Sam
Blue Rinse Ensemble
Bluegrass Parkway
Bluehouse
Brandy, Peter
Cargill, Jenny
Carney, Bernard
Carney, Bernard and Eleanor
Claddaghdance
Clarke's Grey Vest
Comhaltas Ceoltoiri Eireann (Junior Group)
Comhaltas Ceoltoiri Eireann (Senior Group)
Cooking Fruit'n'Veg Children's Cooking
de Bhaldraithe, Orlagh
De'Ath, Loo-weeze
Edward de Bozo
Del Fuego
Desert Child
Dingos Breakfast
Discover It, Draw It - studies in black ink
Dreamtime in the Peel
Drummerdonnas
Eireann Dancing School
Fiddlers Heaven Bush Band
Flamin Butterflies, the
Flute'n'Veg
Ghawazee Girls
Ghosts
Gregory, Jimmy
Gregory, Jimmy and John Deery
Gruner, Ernie
Guitars of the Americas
Hastings, Greg
Hastings, Val and Bob Eden
Hazelton, Lynn
Hobson's Choice
How Long is a Piece of String Band
Hysterically Historical
Jayker
Johnstone, Rosie
Jones, Frank
Jugularity
Kerr, Nancy and James Fagan
Kidz-Fiz-Biz
Last Five Coins, The
Let's Sing Community Choir
Lithgo, Peta and Malaika
Lost and Found
Melville High Swing Band
Melville Senior High School Dancers
Mexican Divorce
Mischief Down Under
Mystique Gypsy Tribal Dance Group
Nazca
Newton-Wordsworth, Kelly
No Nukes Muse
Not Enough Rope
Olafson, Lowry
Osborne, Elle
Pack o' Pirates
Perth International Folk Dance Group
Pigram Brothers
Psallite
Puppetears
Raser-Weed, Melissa
Real Sing, The
Red Sea Pedestrians
Reels in D'd
Resonant Voice
Ride the Rainbow
Rider, Jessie
River Watch Activity
Royal Scottish Country Dance Society
Simpson, Jenny
Sing from the Heart
Singala
Smoker, Joel
Smoker, Joel and the Red Dirt Band
Sock
Songs from a Secret Garden
Suzuki Violin Schoo
Ten Cent Shooters
Theatre sports
Those Darn Squeezeboxes
Trio Grosso
Tucker, Martin
Two Nutters
Velvet Janes
Vena Cava
Vervest, Rod
Vervest, Rod and Dave Clarke
Vibrolators, the
Voices of the Forest
Wadumbah Dance Group
Walters and Warner
Ward, Brian and Jenny
Warwick, Dick (Cowboy Poet)
Watson, Bruce
Whaite, John
Wise Family Band
Wise Trio, The
Wise, Louisa
Wise, Scott
Wrigley, Jennifer and Hazel
Yarnspinners
Zulya

1998
The 1998 festival was held 17–19 April. The acts were:

Action Acting"
African Heartbeat
African Music Congress
Alain Thirion and Kerry Fletcher
All Ordinaries
Anam (Ireland and UK)
An t'Eilean Mor
Andy Brown
Andy Copeland and the Magic Band
Ayesha and Desert Stars
Belly Dance Workshops with Angie
Bindjarreb Middar
Bluegrass Parkway
Bob Eden and Val Hastings
Butterfly Man
C. Weed Raser
Carmen Miranda
Chipolatas
Classical Guitar Ensemble
Comhltas Ceoltoiri Eireaa (Junior Group)
Crooked Road
'Cry of the Sea Dragon'
David Hoffman
Del Fuego
Dingo's Breakfast
Elle Osborne (UK)
Enda Kenny and Neil Adam
Fair Maids of Perth
Faith Petric (US)
Foc'sle Firkins
Fulani
Gamelan Carinakan
Gary Ridge
Glenn B. Swift
Greg Hastings
Greg Hastings and Joan Chenery
Heads We're Dancing
Hobson's Choice
How Long is a Piece of String Band is
Ilan Zagoria
Jandy Lowe
Jenny Simpson
Joe Walley and Amanda Yates
Joel Smoker and Red Dirt Band
John and Pauline Allen
Joy of Sets
Kanyana Chorus
Kavisha Mazzella
Kelly Newton-Wordsworth
Ken Ferguson
Kilmarnock
Kissing Tree
Last Five Coins
Louisa Wise
Mad Dog's Lunchbox
Mandurah City Choral Society
Marcus Sturrock
MacClarke's Gray Vest
McCool
Melody Lane
Moondyne
Moroccan Wedding
Morris West
'Music for Fun'
Mystique Gypsy Tribal
Neil Adam
Nomad
Perth International Dancers
Perth Morris Men
Peta Lithgo and Malaika
Peter Brandy
Peter Keelan
Pony rides
Ragabillys
Red Sea Pedestrians
Riverwatch Activity
Rodney Vervest
Rory McLeod (UK)
Royal Scottish Country Dance Society
Sandpiper Productions and Blow-in Puppets
Scott and Louisa Wise with Sean Diggins
Sheva
Simon Fox
Singala
Steve and Ros Barnes
Steve Tallis Trio
Stinger
Suzuki Violin School
Ten Cent Shooters
Theatresports
The Bargmanns
Tropicana
Velvet James
W.A. Junior Ballet Company
WA Street Arts
Which Music
World Pan Pipe
Zhota Games Dance Workshop

1997
The 1997 festival was held 4–6 April. The acts were:

Sara Grey
James Keelaghan
Sheela Langeberg
Jez Lowe
Tony McManus
Pan Arkestra
Ragabillys
Sensitive New Age Cowpersons
Ten Cent Shooters
The Fling
Whak
Chris While and Julie Matthews
Scott and Louisa Wise
A Kapella Munda and One Voice Choir
All Ordinaries
An t'Eilean Mor Singers
Ayesha & The Desert Stars Belly Dance
Bags of Allsorts
Steve and Ros Barnes with Peter Grayling
Ros Barnes
Bayou Brothers
Binjarreb Middar Dancers
Cameo
Carmel and the Mites
Bernard Carney
Bernard Carney Band
Bernard and Eleanor Carney
Eleanor Carney
Clare Lancers Set Dance
Communal Bathing
Jonathan Cope
Craft Den
Craft Workshops
Dance of East Europe
Dingos Breakfast
Dymaxion Recorder Consort
Dynamic Adventures Abseiling
Elastic Band
Cliff Ellery
Face Painting
Fair Maids of Perth
Niall Fenix and John Reed
Ken Ferguson
Garlands
Hatha Yoga
Lynn Hazelton
Choice
Nick Hunter and Ed Kozinski
Just a Wee Dram Band
Kids Kooking
Life Be in It
Peta Lithgo and Malaika
Lost and Found
Jandy Lowe
Made to Fit
Magic Band
Mask Making
Gabrielle Miller
McCool
Roger Montgomery, Bruce Boyd and Friends
New Man River
New Youth Drama Company
Robert Oats
One Voice Choir
Out of Morocco
Perth International Folk Dance group
Playgroup Association
Psallite
Ran Dan Club
Reels in D'd
Rock Extravaganza
Bob Rummery
Shiralee
Shona Music Ensemble
Jenny Simpson
Singala
Marcus Sturrock
Glen Swift
Tanglewood
Tatenda Africa - formerly Sundiata Marimba Band
Theatresports
The Bargmanns
The Last Five Coins
The Magic Pirate
The Morgans
Trio Grosso
Rodney Vervest
Vicki Flinders and Leola Hollings
Whoops Hello

1996

A Kapella Munda
Abe Shields
African Heartbeat
Ayeshe & The Desert Stars
Belyssa and Desert Fire
Bernard Carney
Bluegrass Parkway
Bob Paterson Revisited
Brimstone and Treacle
Brookhampton Bellringers
Bryce Manning
Cameo
Carcoola Primary School Choir
Ceols' Rince
Cat's Craft
The Chipolatas
Class Act
Dances of India
Dingo's Breakfast – Oz Music & Poetry Band
The Double J's
Dulaman
Edelweiss Dance Group
Eleanor Carney
Eliza Carthy and Nancy Kerr
Eloise Robertson
Face Painters
Fair Maids of Perth
Fiddlers Green
Fiona Patrick
Fritz Fitton
Gamelan Carimankan
Gcalyut
Glenn Swift
Gospel Extravaganza
Grand Finale
Grace Reid and Mike Burns
Greg Hastings
Harvey, Harper and Bruce
The Jesters Handcart Theatre Company
Joel Smoker
Junkelan
Lost and Found
McCool
Magic Pirate
Martin Pearson
Melissa Raser Weed
Michael Family
Musical Mice
Nicole Bennet
Nick Turner
Opening Concert
One Voice Choir
Otozoy
Out of Morocco
Pan Arkestra
Pat Trick
Perth International Folk Dancers
Perth Morris Men
Pixie Stott
Press Gang
The Prickly Pair
Psallite
Ragabillys
Rasing C Weed
Rebecca Fathers
Roc K Extravaganza
Roger Montgomery
Ros Barnes
Scott and Louisa Wise
Scottish Country Dance Society
Sean Roche
Sheva
Shiralee
Sinbad's Daughters
Steve and Ros Barnes
Steve Tallis
Sue Sadler
Suitcase Circus
Theatre Sport S
The Swiss Yodellers OFWA
Tanglefoot
Tanglewood
The Ten Cent Shooters
Vicki Flinders & Trim the Cat
Watson Family & Ken Kenny
Wayne Bloomfield
Whoops Hello

1995
The 1995 festival was held 31 March – 2 April. The acts were:

Angelica and the Aziza Bellydance Ensemble
Applejack
Arrameida
Australian Bite
Avani and Friends
Azuma
Steve and Ross Barnes with Peter Grayling
Bill Beck
Bindjareb Pinjarra Aboriginal Dancers
Bindjareb Pinjarra Aboriginal Theatre
Bluegrass Bandits
Bluegrass Parkway
Christine Boult
The Boundary Riders
Brimstone 'N Treacle
The Brookhampton Bellringers
Nick Brown
Peter Bugden
Canto Sikuri
Bernard Carney
Bernard and Eleanor Carney
Bernard Carney and Peter Grayling
Eleanor Carney
Martin Carthy
Carmel Charlton
Circus Jam
City Farm - Planetary Action Network (Men of the Trees)
Cobwebs
Community Catchment Centre
Cranachan
Custie Chantas
Czimas Hungarian Dancerse
Sophie Dale
The Darling Rangers
Dolcet Quartet
The Double J's
Ellie the Clown
Feelin' Groovy
Jim Fisher
Fritz Fitton
Fo’c's’le Firkins
John Gill
Susan Hall
Harvey, Harper and Bruce
Greg Hastings
Val Hastings
Lynn Hazleton
Nick Hunter
Donna Iverson
Vanessa Johnson
Jugularity
Kanyana Chorus
Max Klubal
Peta Lithgo and Malaika
Looby Loo
Loonie Tunes Swing Band
Los Buskas
Lost and Found
The Magic Pirate
Mandurah Swing Jazz Band
Bryce Manning
McCool
Rita Menendez
Sam and Jamie Michael
Chris Newman and Maire Ni Chathsaigh
One Voice Choir
Peel Preservation Group
Perth International Folk Dancers
Perth Morris Men
Poet on a Tricycle
Press Gang
Ragabillies
Red Pepper
Red Sea Pedestrians
Grace Reid and Mike Burns
The Rhymes and Times of Percy French
Ring-a-Round Wolvens
Eloise Robertson
Roztiazhka Ukrainian Cossack Dancers
Bob Rummery
Sue Sadler
Kevin Saunders
Scottish Dancers
Sensitive New Age Cowpersons
Sheva
Flora Shevlin
Shiralee and Friends
Jenny Simpson
Simpson, Gillespie, and Wright
Sinbad's Daughters
Joel Smoker
Sturt's Pea Bushband
Sundiata Marimba Band
The Suzuki Tour Ensemble
The Ten Cent Shooters
Theatre Sports
Bob Latino (...Alias Tok Pank Tok, ... Alias The Tim Chambers Quartet)
The Travelling Riverside Trio
Trio Grosso
Jay Turner
Nick Turner
Two-Part Invention
Vardos
WA Mandolin Orchestra
Ormonde Waters
Waterson:Carthy
Ali Watson
Donna Weston
John Whaite
Fay White
The Wilderness Society
John Wilson
Louisa Wise
Scott and Louisa Wise
Wunjo
Ilan Zagoria

1994
The 1994 festival was held 15–17 April. The acts were:

Class Act
Ella McCarney
Eleanor Carney
Frank Chauveau
Craft Den
Thery Glen Mike
Jackson and Rowan Hammond
Koongamia Aboriginal Dancers
John Lee (from Scitech)
Eloise Robertson
Julian Scott
Pat-Trick
Atam
The Backsliders
Steve & Ross Barnes
Blackboy Jam
Bluegrass Parkway
Bruce Boyd and the Dustbowl Refugees
Brimstone 'N Treacle
Brookhampton Bellringers
Nick Brown
Peter Bugden
Bill Bunbury
Canto Sikuri
Bernard Carney
Eleanor Carney
Carmol Charlton
David Clark
Comhaltas Ceoltoeri Eireann
Cranachan
Jimmy Crowleythe
Darling Rangers
Dingo's Breakfast
Disgruntled Spouses Mouth Organ Band
The Double J's
Breakdowns and Ken Ferguson
Fair Maids of Perth
Fiddlers Firkins
Fo'c's'le Firkins
Fritz Fritton
The Grey Company
Greg Hastings
The Hungarian Dancers
Mike Jackson and Rowan Hammond
Iris Jones
Joys of the Women
Kanyana Barbershop Chorus
Paul Kooperman
Lock Stock and Teardrops
Lost and Found
McCool
Sam and Jamie Michael
The Mudcats
Perth International Folk Dance Group
Perth Morris Men
Phideauz
The Pioneers
Press-Gang
The Ragabillies
Red Pepper
Rich 'n Famous
Bob Rummery
Sean Roche
Graham Seal
The Settler
Shades of Grey
Joel Smoker
Strings in Harmony
Tok Pan Tok
Toucan Tango
The Travelling Riverside Trio
Trio Grosso
Nick Turner
Vardos
James Webb
Lesley Wheeler
Scott and Louisa Wise

1993
The 1993 festival was held 7–9 May. The acts were:

Alistair Hulett
Dude Ranch
Electric Bill
Fantasia Latina
Kavisha & John Reed
Kelly Newton-Wordsworth
Press Gang
Sundiata
Sister Moon
Roger Montgomery
Ken Ferguson and John Thompson
Greg Hastings
Scott and Louisa Wise
Fritz Fitton
Incidentals
Kelly and Friends
Haver Harper and Bruce
Michael Family
Torryl Fenton
Bob Rummery
David Stinson
Brenda Conerchy
Bluegrass Parkway
Fo'c's'le Firkins
Shaun Docherty

References

External links
 

Folk festivals in Australia
Music festivals established in 1993